Erstad is a surname. Notable people with the surname include:

Darin Erstad (born  1974), American baseball player
Jacob Erstad (1898–1963), Norwegian gymnast 
Jostein Erstad (1922–2011), Norwegian jurist
Sindre Erstad (born 1982), Norwegian footballer

Norwegian-language surnames